Linacy is an unincorporated community in Pictou County in the Canadian province of Nova Scotia near the much larger town of New Glasgow.

History 
Linacy was named for Edward Linacy, one of the area's first settlers.

Navigator

References 

Communities in Pictou County